The 2018 National Lacrosse League season, also known as the 2017–18 season, was the 32nd season in NLL history. It began on December 8, 2017, and ending on June 9, 2018, with the Saskatchewan Rush winning their 3rd title in 4 years.

Final standings

Playoffs

*Overtime

Awards

Annual awards

All-Pro First Team
 Kevin Crowley, New England Black Wolves
 Mark Matthews, Saskatchewan Rush
 Robert Church, Saskatchewan Rush
 Joey Cupido, Colorado Mammoth
 Graeme Hossack, Rochester Knighthawks
 Matt Vinc, Rochester Knighthawks

All-Pro Second Team
 Curtis Dickson, Calgary Roughnecks
 Joe Resetarits, Rochester Knighthawks
 Lyle Thompson, Georgia Swarm
 Zach Currier, Calgary Roughnecks
 Kyle Rubisch, Saskatchewan Rush
 Dillon Ward, Colorado Mammoth

All-Rookie Team 
 Josh Byrne, Buffalo Bandits
 Zach Currier, Calgary Roughnecks
 Eric Fannell, Rochester Knighthawks
 Austin Shanks, Rochester Knighthawks
 Colton Watkinson, New England Black Wolves
 Jake Withers, Rochester Knighthawks

Stadiums and locations

Attendance
NLL drew 762,367 spectators to its regular-season matches during the 2018 season. The average regular-season home attendance for each team is shown in the table below.

See also
 2018 in sports

References

National Lacrosse League
National Lacrosse League seasons